Mary Anne Rymill (1817–1897) was an English emigrant to New Zealand who was a missionary, teacher, nurse and companion. She was born in London, England.

References

1817 births
1897 deaths
English Anglican missionaries
Anglican missionaries in New Zealand
Female Christian missionaries
English emigrants to New Zealand
New Zealand nurses
New Zealand schoolteachers
19th-century New Zealand people
New Zealand women nurses